Daniel Hart may refer to:

Daniel Anthony Hart (1927–2008), American prelate of the Roman Catholic Church
Danny Hart (footballer) (born 1989), English footballer
Danny Hart (cyclist) (born 1991), English mountain biker
Daniel Hart (musician), American musician